Josef Karas may refer to:

Josef Karas (athlete) (born 1978), Czech decathlete
Joža Karas (1926–2008), Polish-born, Czech-American musician and teacher 
Josef Karas (politician) (1867–1943), Czech and Czechoslovak lawyer, politician and interwar senator